The Territory is a 1981 Portuguese philosophical horror film directed by Chilean filmmaker Raúl Ruiz about two American families who resort to cannibalism shortly after getting lost on a camping trip in the South of France. The film, about the animalistic nature of humans when they disregard their "civilized" instincts, obliquely addresses themes of "exile and crossing boundaries: of language, nation and morality".

Cast
 Isabelle Weingarten as Françoise, Jim's partner
 Rebecca Pauly as Barbara, Peter's partner
 Geoffrey Carey as Peter, Barbara's partner
 Jeffrey Kime as Jim, Françoise's partner
 Paul Getty Jr. as Guide, uncle to Linda's daughter
 Shila Turna as Linda
 Artur Semedo as Indefinite man
 Camila Mora as Young girl
 Ethan Stone as Young boy, Françoise's son
 José Nascimento as Prawler
 Duarte de Almeida as Indefinite man's friend, found in the territory as a man lost for much longer than them
 Rita Nascimento as Linda's daughter

Production
The circumstances in which the film was produced, and the extent of Corman's involvement, are somewhat mysterious, co-writer Adair claiming that the film was made under "hair-raising conditions" in Sintra. The production's budgetary difficulties inspired New German Cinema director Wim Wenders to make the Golden Lion-winning The State of Things (1982) with much of the same cast and crew.

Reception
Stephen Holden from The New York Times called it "an odd little art film that has the feel of a European version of an episode of The Twilight Zone." Dennis Schwartz of Ozus' World Movie Reviews awarded the film a grade B+, calling it "Deliciously subversive".

References

External links
 
 
 
 

1981 films
1981 drama films
1980s horror drama films
Portuguese drama films
Portuguese horror films
1980s French-language films
Films directed by Raúl Ruiz
Films produced by Paulo Branco
1980s English-language films